The Timucua were a Native American people of northern Florida and southeastern Georgia.

Timucua may also refer to:
Timucua language, the language spoken by the Timucua people
Northern Utina, also known as the Timucua, a particular Timucua chiefdom
Timucuan Ecological and Historic Preserve, wetland preserve and archaeological site near Jacksonville, Florida